Tinsel Town, Tinseltown, Tinsel-Town or other variants may refer to:

Film industry
 Hollywood, Los Angeles, a neighborhood in Los Angeles, California, associated with the U.S. film industry
 Cinema of the United States generally
 Film Nagar, a neighborhood in Hyderabad, Telangana, India, notable as a home of Telugu cinema

Music
 Tinsel Town Rebellion, a 1981 rock album by Frank Zappa
 "Tinseltown", a 1988 song by Spear of Destiny off the album The Price You Pay
 "Tinsel Town", a 1994 single by Ronny Jordan
 "Tinsel Town", a 1999 song by Feeder off the album Yesterday Went Too Soon
 "Tinseltown", a 2000 Christmas song by SHeDAISY off the album Brand New Year
 "Tinsel Town", a 2003 song by Seal off the album Seal IV
 "Tinsel Town", a 2004 song by Ash off the album Meltdown (Ash album)
 "Tinsel Town", a 2008 song by Jellyfish off the album Catnip Dynamite
 Tinsel Town, a 2012 Christmas album by Jimmy Rankin
 "Tinseltown", a 2017 track by Leyland Kirby off the album We, So Tired of All the Darkness in Our Lives

Other topics
 Tinsel Town (TV series), 2000 BBC television drama about fictional night club "Tinsel Town"
 Tinseltown: Murder, Morphine, and Madness at the Dawn of Hollywood, a 2004 book by William J. Mann
 Tinseltown, a 2007 film by The Jim Henson Company
 TinselTown, a brand of candles sold in Ireland and Scotland by O-Pee-Chee
 Tinseltown, temporary Christmastime name for Castletown railway station on the Isle of Man

See also

 Film industry, the movie making sector of the economy
 Bollywood, the Hindi-language film industry of India centered in Mumbai
 Paparazzi!: Tales of Tinseltown, a 1995 video game
 Christmas market, a street market associated with the celebration of Christmas
 
 
 Hollywood (disambiguation)
 Tinsel (disambiguation)
 Town (disambiguation)